Kārsava Municipality is a former municipality in Latgale, Latvia. The municipality was formed in 2009 by merging Goliševa Parish, Malnava Parish, Mērdzene Parish, Mežvidi Parish, Salnava Parish and Kārsava town, the administrative centre being Kārsava.

On 1 July 2021, Kārsava Municipality ceased to exist and its territory was merged into Ludza Municipality.

See also 
 Administrative divisions of Latvia (2009)

References 

 
Former municipalities of Latvia